The 1976 FIBA Intercontinental Cup William Jones was the 10th edition of the FIBA Intercontinental Cup for men's basketball clubs. It took place at Buenos Aires, Argentina.

Participants

League stage
Day 1, October 1 1976

|}

Day 2, October 2 1976

|}

Day 3, October 3 1976

|}

Day 4, October 4 1976

|}

Day 5, October 5 1976

|}

Final standings

External links
 1976 Intercontinental Cup William Jones

1976
1976–77 in European basketball
1976–77 in South American basketball
1976–77 in American college basketball
1976
1976 in Argentine sport
International basketball competitions hosted by Argentina
1976 in African basketball
October 1976 sports events in South America